Beyond (simplified Chinese: X元素) is a Singaporean Chinese drama which has been telecasted on Singapore's free-to-air channel, MediaCorp Channel 8. It stars Jeanette Aw, Pierre Png, Li Nanxing, Xiang Yun and Shaun Chen as the casts of the series. It made its debut on 24 Dec 2012. This drama serial consists of 20 episodes, and was screened on every weekday night at 9:00 pm, it is a year end blockbuster for 2012.

The series is the sixth highest-rated drama serial in 2013, with an average viewership of 834,000.

Plot

Welcome to the realm of the unexplained, where things are not exactly what they seem and where one can get sucked into an alternative reality or a different dimension.

Jeanette Aw plays the protagonist gifted with the extraordinary ability to see a person as they are inside. Together with Li Nan Xing, who plays an eccentric private investigator in search of his missing fiancée, the duo brave challenges as they seek to unravel mysteries of the unknown dimensions.

The intriguing investigative drama also stars Pierre Png as the psychiatrist with charisma, Shaun Chen and Xiang Yun. Each case covers three to four thrilling episodes.

Cast

Main cast

Other cast

Ep 1–4: Storey 13.5

Ep 5–8: Youth stealer

Ep 9–11: Kampong Mimpi
The villagers appeared in episodes 10 and 11. Scenes took place in Kampong Buangkok.

Ep 12–14: Back in time

Ep 15–17: Wenbin's inner soul

Ep 18–20: Another dimension / "Déjà vu"
(Storyline formed as a result of the events in 'Back in time')

Production 
The drama was originally meant to be called 异能元素.

Filming for this drama started on end Apr 2012 and completed its filming in early Jul. Due to special effects used in the drama, the drama is only broadcast at the end of the year.

Trivia
 Dennis Chew's return to acting on TV after 10 years. He last acted in the sitcom My Genie 2 in 2002.
 Jeanette Aw will play two roles as Zhiqing. She will play in both the real dimension and the alternate dimension.

Accolades

See also
 List of MediaCorp Channel 8 Chinese Drama Series (2010s)

References

External links
Official website of Beyond on Xinmsn
BAGUA8 blog

Singapore Chinese dramas
2012 Singaporean television series debuts
Channel 8 (Singapore) original programming